Bonosus may refer to any of:

 Bonosus (usurper), a Romano-British naval officer and usurper
 Bonosus of Trier, bishop of Trier (-373)
 Bonosus of Naissus, bishop of Naissus
 Bonosus of Sardica, bishop of Sardica (–414), heresiarch of the Bonosians

See also
 Bonus (Sirmium), a Byzantine general who defended Sirmium during a Gepid invasion erroneously recorded as "Bonosus" in some histories
 Bonus (patrician), a Byzantine general erroneously recorded as "Bonosus" in some histories
 Bonus (disambiguation)